The 2016 season was the Arizona Cardinals' 97th in the National Football League, their 118th overall, their 29th in Arizona, their 11th at University of Phoenix Stadium and their fourth under head coach Bruce Arians.

In free agency, they signed veteran defensive back Tyvon Branch and veteran lineman Evan Mathis, while re-signing several key players. They traded for Chandler Jones from the New England Patriots, sending Jonathan Cooper and a late second-round pick to New England.

The Cardinals came into the 2016 season with expectations of improving on their 2015 campaign and reaching the Super Bowl. However, after a 1–3 start, they suffered injuries to quarterback Carson Palmer and most of the offensive line. On October 23, the Cardinals and the Seattle Seahawks played out a 6–6 tie; this was the Cardinals' first tie since 1986 when they were the St. Louis Cardinals. It was also the lowest-scoring NFL tie since overtime was introduced in 1974. The Cardinals were eliminated from playoff contention in Week 15 after a loss to the New Orleans Saints. Despite winning their final two games, the Cardinals ended the season with a losing record at 7–8–1. Because the Chicago Cubs won the 2016 World Series, their first title in 108 years, the Cardinals also finished the season with the longest active championship drought in the four major American professional sports, with their last championship in 1947 as the Chicago Cardinals.

Free agents

Draft

Notes
 The Cardinals traded their second-round selection (No. 61 overall) and guard Jonathan Cooper to the New England Patriots in exchange for defensive end Chandler Jones.
 The Cardinals traded a conditional seventh-round selection to the Philadelphia Eagles in exchange for quarterback Matt Barkley; the Eagles will only receive this selection if Barkley is on the Cardinals' roster for at least six games during the  season.
 The Cardinals received a sixth-round compensatory pick (No. 170 overall) as the result of a negative differential of free agent signings and departures that the Cardinals experienced during the  free agency period.

Staff

Final roster

Preseason

Regular season

Schedule

Note: Intra-division opponents are in bold text.

Game summaries

Week 1: vs. New England Patriots

With Patriots quarterback Tom Brady suspended and Jimmy Garoppolo starting, the Cardinals were huge favorites to win. The game was close, but was lost last minute, with a missed game-winning Cardinals field goal.

Week 2: vs. Tampa Bay Buccaneers

Week 3: at Buffalo Bills

Week 4: vs. Los Angeles Rams

Week 5: at San Francisco 49ers

Week 6: vs. New York Jets

This was the Cardinals' first win over the Jets since 1975, when the Cardinals were based in St. Louis, Missouri.

Week 7: vs. Seattle Seahawks

Cardinals placekicker Chandler Catanzaro and Seahawks placekicker Steven Hauschka each miss game winning field goals as the game finishes in a 6-6 tie and the Cardinals earn their first tie since the 1986 season.

Week 8: at Carolina Panthers

In a rematch of the NFC championship, the Panthers led by as much as 24 points until Arizona ended the game by cutting the lead to 10.

Week 10: vs. San Francisco 49ers

Week 11: at Minnesota Vikings

Week 12: at Atlanta Falcons

Week 13: vs. Washington Redskins

Week 14: at Miami Dolphins
This was the Cardinals' first loss to the Dolphins since 1999.

Week 15: vs. New Orleans Saints

With the close loss, the Cardinals were eliminated from the playoffs for the first time since 2013.

Week 16: at Seattle Seahawks

Week 17: at Los Angeles Rams

Despite losing running back David Johnson to a knee injury in the first quarter, Arizona still managed to blow out the Rams, 44-6 to finish the year at 7-8-1.

Standings

Division

Conference

References

External links

 

Arizona
Arizona Cardinals seasons
Arizona Cardinals